The Bulgaria men's national under-16 basketball team is the national representative for Bulgaria in international under-16 basketball tournaments. The team is administered by the Bulgarian Basketball Federation.

FIBA U16 European Championship participations

See also
Bulgaria men's national basketball team
Bulgaria men's national under-19 basketball team

References

External links
Official website 
Archived records of Bulgaria team participations

Basketball in Bulgaria
basketball
Men's national under-16 basketball teams